¿Quién contra nosotros? (in English, Who against us?) is the tenth album by Christian rapper Alex Zurdo, released on August 17, 2018, by his label AZ Music. It had the participation of Redimi2, Funky, Melvin Ayala, Marcos Witt, René González, Manny Montes, Gabriel Rodríguez EMC, Indiomar, GaVriel, Jaime Barceló, Natán El Profeta, Kike Pavón and the duo Antonio & Joel. The songs were produced mostly by Xerran, Ito and Alex Zurdo himself.

The album was nominated at the 2019 Latin Grammy Awards in the category "Best Christian Album in Spanish", also, it obtained at the Dove Awards in 2018 the recognition of "Song of the Year in Spanish" for the single «Sin ti», while in 2019, this production was awarded as "Album of the Year in Spanish" and the song «Mi GPS» was nominated for song in Spanish of the year. Also, this album was awarded "Best Urban Album" at the ARPA Awards 2019.

Background 
Prior to the release of the album, the singles "Lo Mío No Pasa" became known since the end of 2016, a single that won an AMCL Award in 2017 for Urban Song of the Year, «Una nueva canción» ("A New Song") with Kike Pavón, «Lo Mío No Pasa» (salsa version) with Antonio & Joel, «Sin ti», «No cuenten conmigo», «Volveré» (I'll be back) with Jaime Barceló (previously, Jaime de León) and «Mi GPS» (this song appeared on the Billboard page).

The album was released on August 17, 2018, after its publication, three additional songs ¿Quién contra nosotros? (in English, Who against us?) were promoted, «Todo lo puedo» ("All I Can") in collaboration with Funky and «Cambiaste mi corazón» ("You changed my heart") together with their official videos. For the song "La Pasajera" with Indiomar and Gabriel Rodríguez EMC, a video of lyrics released on February 28, 2019, was handled.

Music videos

Tracklist 

 ¿Quién Contra Nosotros? - Alex Zurdo
 No Cuenten Conmigo - Alex Zurdo
 Cambiaste Mi Corazón - Alex Zurdo
 Cuando Se Acaba La Nota - Alex Zurdo feat. Redimi2
 Todo Lo Puedo - Alex Zurdo feat. Funky
 Mi GPS - Alex Zurdo
 No Hay Pero Va a Sobrar - Alex Zurdo feat. Marcos Witt
 Mi Refugio - Alex Zurdo feat. Manny Montes, Melvin Ayala & GaVriel
 Mira Mis Ojos - Alex Zurdo feat. Natán El Profeta
 Nada Me Falta - Alex Zurdo
 Volveré - Alex Zurdo feat. Jaime Barceló
 Pa'que Oren - Alex Zurdo
 La Pasajera - Alex Zurdo feat. Indiomar, Gabriel Rodríguez EMC
 Tiempo = Amor - Alex Zurdo feat. René González
 No Busques Culpables - Alex Zurdo
 La Vida Vana - Alex Zurdo
 Sin Ti - Alex Zurdo
 Una Nueva Canción - Alex Zurdo feat. Kike Pavón
 Lo Mío No Pasa
 Lo Mío No Pasa (Salsa Remix) - Alex Zurdo feat. Antonio & Joel

Awards and nominations

References 

2018 albums
Latin Grammy Award for Best Christian Album (Spanish Language)